Emiliano Ancheta Da Rosa (born 9 June 1999) is a Uruguayan professional footballer who plays as right-back for Uruguayan Primera División club Albion.

References

1999 births
Living people
Uruguayan footballers
Uruguayan Primera División players
Danubio F.C. players
Association football defenders
Uruguay under-20 international footballers